This page is a timeline of major events in the history of cellular agriculture.  Cellular agriculture refers to the development of agricultural products - especially animal products - from cell cultures rather than the bodies of living organisms.  This includes in vitro or cultured meat, as well as cultured dairy, eggs, leather, gelatin, and silk.  In recent years a number of cellular animal agriculture companies and non-profits have emerged due to technological advances and increasing concern over the animal welfare and rights, environmental, and public health problems associated with conventional animal agriculture.

Timeline

See also
Cultured Meat
Cellular agriculture
Cellular Agriculture Society
Beyond Meat
Memphis Meats
History of vegetarianism
Timeline of animal welfare and rights
Veganism
Meat analogue

References

Agriculture-related lists
Cellular agriculture
History of agriculture